Golebiowski or Gołębiowski or “Golebiovski (feminine: Gołębiowska; plural: Gołębiowscy) is a Polish surname. It is sometimes spelled Golembiowski or Gołembiowski (feminine: Gołembiowska). Notable people with the surname include:

 Kelly Golebiowski (born 1981), Australian footballer
 Łukasz Gołębiowski (1773–1849), Polish ethnographer and historian

See also
 
 Golebiewski, a related surname

Polish-language surnames